April Fools is a 1930 comedy novel by the British writer Compton Mackenzie. It is the sequel to his 1919 work Poor Relations.

References

Bibliography
 David Joseph Dooley. Compton Mackenzie. Twayne Publishers, 1974.
 Andro Linklater. Compton Mackenzie: A Life Hogarth Press, 1992.

1930 British novels
Novels by Compton Mackenzie
British comedy novels
Cassell (publisher) books
Doubleday, Doran books